Lee–Hines Field is a baseball stadium in Baton Rouge, Louisiana. It is the home field of the Southern Jaguars baseball team.

Tournaments
Lee–Hines Field served as host of the 2008 Southwestern Athletic Conference baseball tournament from May 13 through 17. The stadium hosted the 2012 Southwestern Athletic Conference baseball tournament from May 16 through 20, 2012, which was won by Prairie View A&M.

See also
 List of NCAA Division I baseball venues

References

College baseball venues in the United States
Baseball venues in Baton Rouge, Louisiana
Southern Jaguars baseball